Gold Against the Soul is the second studio album by Welsh alternative rock band Manic Street Preachers. It was released on 21 June 1993 by record label Columbia.

Noted for its lyrics reflecting melancholia, Gold Against the Soul integrated a variation of styles, including funk and grunge.

Recording 
The band stated that the choice to work with Dave Eringa again was important for this album: "We finished work in November and then just went straight into a demo studio and we came out about four weeks later with the album all finished. We were all happy with all the songs, we knew what they wanted to sound like, so we didn't want to use a mainstream producer because they've got their own sound and vision of what a record should be like. So we just phoned Dave up and said 'Look, come down, let's see how this works out', and everyone loved what we were doing, so we decided to stay with him."

When asked to look back on the album, the band themselves have described Gold Against the Soul as their least favourite album and the period surrounding the album as being the most unfocused of their career. The band's vocalist and guitarist James Dean Bradfield has said "All we wanted to do was go under the corporate wing. We thought we could ignore it but you do get affected."

Content

Lyrics, writing and themes 
Simon Price of The Telegraph opined that the lyrics on Gold Against the Soul "switched from the political [of Generation Terrorists] to the personal". The lyrical content is considerably less political than their previous album Generation Terrorists, and the album is more reflective of the despair and melancholy of their later work.

"La Tristesse Durera" (literally "the sadness will go on") is the title of a biography of Vincent van Gogh, although the song is not about him but about a war veteran.

Style and influences 
The album presents a different sound from their debut album, not only in terms of lyrics but in sound. The band privileged long guitar riffs and the drums feel more present and loud in the final mix of the album. This sound would be abandoned in their next album. According to AllMusic, the album takes "the hard rock inclinations of Generation Terrorists to an extreme." Meanwhile, Dave de Sylvia at Sputnikmusic characterized it as a glam rock album, similar to that of Bon Jovi, with Simon Price likening the record to "a blend of Bon Jovi and Nirvana". Cam Lindsay of Exclaim! proclaimed it to be a "sullen glam rock" album. Writing Leyendas Urbanas del Rock in 2019, José Luis Martín proclaimed that Gold Against the Soul saw the Manics "abandon glam punk and dangerously approach grunge". Tom Doyle of Q called the sound of the album "epic pop-rock", while Gigwise described it as "hair metal".

The album displayed a variety of styles; "Roses in the Hospital" tapped into a "stadium funk-rock" style, while "La Tristesse Durera" incorporated a quiet-loud dynamic which Ron Jovanovic opined to "follow the grunge template".

Regarding the album's influences, bassist Nicky Wire remarked that Gold Against the Soul was "all Alice in Chains and Red Hot Chili Peppers", and that he was emulating Flea at the time.

Release 
Gold Against the Soul was released on 14 June 1993. It reached number 8 on the UK Albums Chart. The album has since gone Gold (100,000 copies) and spent more than 10 weeks in the Top 75. Gold Against the Soul also charted within the Top 100 in Germany and within the Top 50 in Japan.

Four singles were released from the album. "From Despair to Where" was the lead single. "La Tristesse Durera (Scream to a Sigh)" was the second single from the album and it has been described by many as its highlight. The third single, "Roses in the Hospital", peaked at number 15 on the UK Singles Chart, the highest-charting single from the band's first three albums. The fourth and final single, "Life Becoming a Landslide", charted at number 36, which would be the lowest charting single by the band until 2011's "Some Kind of Nothingness".

In March 2020, following several anniversary re-releases of old albums in previous years, the Manics announced a deluxe reissue of Gold Against the Soul for release on 12 June 2020. Bonus content included previously unreleased demos, B-sides from the era, remixes, and a live recording, while the CD was released alongside a book of unseen photographs from the era with handwritten annotations and lyrics from the band.

Reception 

Gold Against the Soul has received generally mixed reviews from critics.

Stuart Bailie, writing for the NME, called the album "confusing" and "too much Slash and not enough burn", but did compliment its musicality, saying "the drums and guitars rumble higher in the mix, and massive, harmonising riffs are everywhere". In his review for Vox, Keith Cameron remarked that the album showed Manic Street Preachers "skating gingerly over that treacherous Difficult Second Album ice". Qs Peter Kane was more critical, calling the album "superficially competent, of course, but scratch below the surface and you'll find few signs of life, just a vaguely expressed, bemused and bored dissatisfaction". In Spin, Simon Reynolds opined that the band "motor-mouth a fine manifesto, but haven't got a musical bone between them".

Among more favourable reviews, Stuart Maconie of Select praised the album as "a mammoth development even from their excellent debut" and "almost without exception terrific", while Melody Maker remarked that the band had "stayed beautiful". Kerrang! and Melody Maker listed Gold Against the Soul at number 8 and number 25, respectively, in their end-of-year lists of the best albums of 1993.

Legacy 
Both the NME and Q have since revised their opinions of Gold Against the Soul in some later articles, with the former's Paul Stokes opining that its short, "snappy, driven and focused" length contrasts with other albums' "indulgently lengthy tracklistings", and suggesting that "with its big, radio-friendly Dave Eringa production, it's easy to see why Gold Against the Soul caused such a stir compared to the wild, almost feral rock of Generation Terrorists that preceded it a year earlier. However, with the band's more beefed up, arena-friendly sound emerging in subsequent years, this album is no longer so at odds with the general Manics aesthetic." The latter publication, in a retrospective review of The Holy Bible, looked back on Gold Against the Soul as "an underrated pop-metal effort that's armed with a handful of bona-fide big tunes", and cited "La Tristesse Durera (Scream to a Sigh)" as its highlight.

In his retrospective review, Stephen Thomas Erlewine of AllMusic described Gold Against the Soul as a "flawed but intriguing second album". Sputnikmusic writer Dave de Sylvia called it "a fine, and certainly underappreciated, album which fell victim to the weight of expectation generated by its predecessor and fell well short of the standard set by its successor, The Holy Bible, released the following year. The album has many flaws – it's rushed; it's formulaic in parts; the music was sometimes compromised in the search for a hit, but behind these flaws lies a solid rock 'n' roll album with a deeper, more profound edge than most any other rock album you'll hear." Joe Tangari of Pitchfork, however, lambasted Gold Against the Soul as a "labored, sophomore-slumping hard rock turd that had them looking washed up early", concluding that "there was really no preparation for the intensity, perversion and genuine darkness of The Holy Bible" which would follow in 1994.

"It's fair to say that history judged Gold… slightly unjustly," wrote Drowned in Sounds Ben Patashnik in 2008. He added that the album was "heavy, melodic and packed full of huge choruses: radio-friendly doesn’t have to be used in the pejorative sense and it's certainly more considered and mature than their debut." Tom Ewing of Freaky Trigger hailed Gold Against the Soul as "a half-classic of sensitive metal" that built upon the style of the Manics' earlier single "Motorcycle Emptiness". He highlighted the "confused-nihilist persona internalised and fucked up to the point of collapse, while the riffs just keep on playing." In 2013, "La Tristesse Durera (Scream to a Sigh)" was chosen by Clash as one of their favourite Manic Street Preachers singles.

Gold Against the Soul was given a deluxe re-issue in 2020 with each track remastered, complete with an 120-page A4 book of photos taken by Mitch Ikeda and scans of original lyric sheets plus previously unreleased demos. In his review for FMS Magazine, Jimi Arundell addresses the discomfort the band have previously expressed about the record; "It seems that the band have exorcised the needless shame they have always seemed to carry for their second album, and finally given Gold Against The Soul the respect it deserves".

Track listing

Personnel 

 Manic Street Preachers

 James Dean Bradfield – lead vocals, lead, rhythm and acoustic guitars, backing vocals
 Richey Edwards (credited as Richey James) – rhythm guitar (credited but only performs on 'La Tristesse Durera (Scream to a Sigh)'), backing vocals
 Sean Moore – drums, sampled percussion, drum programming on "Nostalgic Pushead" and "Gold Against the Soul", additional programming, backing vocals
 Nicky Wire – bass guitar, backing vocals

 Additional personnel

 Dave Eringa – piano, Hammond organ
 Ian Kewley – piano, Hammond organ
 Nick Ingman – string arrangements
 Shovell – percussion

 Technical personnel

 Dave Eringa – production, engineering, mixing
 Lee Phillips - engineering assistance
 Andy Baker - engineering assistance
 Giles Cowley - mixing assistance
 Dave Bascombe - mixing on "Sleepflower", "La Tristesse Durera (Scream to a Sigh)" and "Yourself"
 Andy Bradfield - mixing assistance on "Sleepflower", "La Tristesse Durera (Scream to a Sigh)" and "Yourself"
 Mitch Ikeda - photography

Charts

References

External links 

 Gold Against the Soul at YouTube (streamed copy where licensed)
 

Manic Street Preachers albums
1993 albums
Albums produced by Dave Eringa
Hard rock albums by Welsh artists
Columbia Records albums